Banhua is the Chinese umbrella term for any printed art objects, and especially for those made by woodblock printing, the term used for woodcuts from Asia.

History

The direct translation of 'Banhua' is 'printed picture', it is a general term for original prints or printmaking as an art form. 'Banhua' is composed of two characters: 'ban' meaning 'block' and 'hua' meaning 'picture'. Banhua's meaning does not limited in prints in Chinese style.

As printing first appeared in 3rd century China, artists started to use woodblock printing or other methods to spread their works. Buddhist classics, novel illustrations, and the banknote were among the first public works to be printed in China.

From the 17th century, prints of New Year pictures became popular.

See also
Lianhuanhua
Manhua
Chinese animation
Dongman

References

 
Arts in China
Printmaking
Chinese art